William H. McGuffey Primary School, also known as the McGuffy Art Center, is a historic elementary school located at Charlottesville, Virginia.  It was built in 1915–1916, and is a two-story, rectangular, Colonial Revival style brick building.  It features single-story Tuscan order porticos that project from each side elevation as well as from the front façade.  It is topped by a slate covered, low pitched, hipped roof.  It was named
for William Holmes McGuffey (1800-1873) the author of the first standard U.S. reader series who was a staunch advocate of public education and a University of Virginia professor of moral philosophy. McGuffey School ceased to be a public school in 1973.

It was listed on the National Register of Historic Places in 2009.  It is located in the Charlottesville and Albemarle County Courthouse Historic District.

References

School buildings on the National Register of Historic Places in Virginia
Colonial Revival architecture in Virginia
School buildings completed in 1916
Schools in Charlottesville, Virginia
National Register of Historic Places in Charlottesville, Virginia
Individually listed contributing properties to historic districts on the National Register in Virginia
1916 establishments in Virginia